Qobustan is a village in the municipality of Pirəkəşkül-Qobustan in the Absheron District of Azerbaijan.

References

Populated places in Absheron District